Andrea Weiss is an American rabbi, author, and Assistant Professor of Bible at Hebrew Union College-Jewish Institute of Religion in New York, where she was ordained in 1993. 

In 2006, she published the book Figurative Language in Biblical Prose Narrative: Metaphor in the Book of Samuel (Supplements to Vetus Testamentum). She was associate editor of The Torah: A Women’s Commentary, which won the 2008 Jewish Book of the Year Award from the Jewish Book Council. She was once a student of Tamara Cohn Eskenazi, who was the chief editor of the book. 

Weiss gave the 2012 Goodman Lecture at St. Catherine's University on "Ancient Words, New Voices: The Story of The Torah—A Women’s Commentary. 

The Center for American Progress named Weiss as a faith leader to watch in 2018 because of her efforts to highlight the voices of a diverse set of religious scholars.

The art exhibit “Holy Sparks”, which opened in February 2022 at the Heller Museum and the Skirball Museum, featured 24 Jewish women artists, who had each created an artwork about a female rabbi who was a first in some way. Debbie Teicholz Guedalia created the artwork about Weiss.

References

American Reform rabbis
Reform women rabbis
Living people
Year of birth missing (living people)
Hebrew Union College – Jewish Institute of Religion faculty
21st-century American Jews